Campton Hills is a village in Kane County, Illinois and is a western suburb of Chicago. The population of the village is 11,131 per the 2010 US Census.

The village was established on May 14, 2007, by incorporating 20.3 square miles of Campton and Plato townships, including the unincorporated community of Wasco. The incorporation followed an April 17 referendum in which 55 percent of voters approved incorporation. Several areas on the village's boundaries disconnected within the first year of incorporation, taking advantage of less restrictive requirements imposed by state statute during that period. As of August 2009, the village comprises .

The village is served by three school districts. The majority is served by St. Charles Community Unit School District 303 while the northern end is served by Central Community Unit School District 301. Kaneland Community Unit School District 302 serves the far southwest portion of the village.

The first president and one of the founders of the village was Patsy Smith. Due to confusion over the requirements of Illinois election laws, an opposition group filed nominating petitions for a primary election to be held in February 2015; in previous municipal elections it had been believed that a primary was not required for the non-partisan general election. Over the objections of Smith and her supporters, a Kane County judge affirmed the requirement for a primary. Forced to run as a write-in candidate in the general election, Smith lost in her bid for re-election to Harry Blecker, an incumbent village trustee who had appeared on the primary ballot as a candidate for village president.

Geography
Campton Hills is bordered by Saint Charles to the east, Lily Lake to the west, Elburn to the south and Elgin to the north.

Demographics

As of the census of 2010, there were 11,131 people, 3,492 occupied households, of those 90.4% are family households. The racial makeup of the village was 96.8% White, 0.3% African American, 0.4% Chippewa (group) American Indian, 1.5% Asian (with no Japanese or Vietnamese), and 1.0% both White and Asian. No person from the 2010 census was from a race not listed above. Hispanic or Latino of any race were 3% of the population.

The average household size was 3.19 and the average family size was 3.36 individuals.

All age groups are represented including those 85 and older which make up 0.5% of the population. The age group between 25 and 34 years old is under-represented at 4.4%.

The median income for a household in the village was $128,633, and the median income for a family was $137,539. The per capita income for the village was $47,398. Those in poverty between the ages of 18 to 64 years was 4.7%.

Comprehensive plan
In July 2012, the village released a comprehensive plan detailing future outlooks and developmental goals. Topics included village history, demographics, an outline of principles, policies and strategies, and also proposals for further commercial, residential and community development.

As of March 2013, Campton Hills has an established open space initiative.

References

External links
 Official website

Populated places established in 2007
Villages in Illinois
Villages in Kane County, Illinois
2007 establishments in Illinois